The Leonids are a prolific meteor shower associated with the comet Tempel–Tuttle, which are also known for their spectacular meteor storms that occur about every 33 years. The Leonids get their name from the location of their radiant in the constellation Leo: the meteors appear to radiate from that point in the sky. Their proper Greek name should be Leonids, but the word was initially constructed as a Greek/Latin hybrid and it has been used since. The meteor shower peak should be on 17 November, but any outburst is likely to be from the 1733 meteoroid stream.

Earth moves through the meteoroid stream of particles left from the passages of a comet. The stream comprises solid particles, known as meteoroids, ejected by the comet as its frozen gases evaporate under the heat of the Sun when it is close enough – typically closer than Jupiter's orbit. An annual Leonid shower may deposit 12 or 13 tons of particles across the entire planet.

The meteoroids left by the comet are organized in trails in orbits similar tothough different fromthat of the comet. They are differentially disturbed by the planets, in particular Jupiter, and to a lesser extent by radiation pressure from the Sunthe Poynting–Robertson effect and the Yarkovsky effect. These trails of meteoroids cause meteor showers when Earth encounters them. Old trails are spatially not dense and compose the meteor shower with a few meteors per minute. In the case of the Leonids, that tends to peak around 18 November, but some are spread through several days on either side and the specific peak changes every year. Conversely, young trails are spatially very dense and the cause of meteor outbursts when the Earth enters one.

The Leonids also produce meteor storms (very large outbursts) about every 33 years, during which activity exceeds 1,000 meteors per hour, with some events exceeding 100,000 meteors per hour, in contrast to the sporadic background (5 to 8 meteors per hour) and the shower background (several meteors per hour).

History

1800s

The Leonids are famous because their meteor showers, or storms, can be among the most spectacular. Because of the storm of 1833 and the recent developments in scientific thought of the time (see for example the identification of Halley's Comet), the Leonids have had a major effect on the development of the scientific study of meteors, which had previously been thought to be atmospheric phenomena. Although it has been suggested the Leonid meteor shower and storms have been noted in ancient times, it was the meteor storm of 1833 that broke into people's modern-day awareness – it was of truly superlative strength. One estimate of the peak rate is over one hundred thousand meteors an hour, while another, done as the storm abated, estimated in excess of 240,000 meteors during the nine hours of the storm, over the entire region of North America east of the Rocky Mountains.

It was marked by several nations of Native Americans: the Cheyenne established a peace treaty and the Lakota calendar was reset. Many Native American birthdays were calculated by reference to the 1833 Leonid event. Abolitionists including Harriet Tubman and Frederick Douglass as well as slave-owners took note and others. The New York Evening Post carried a series of articles on the event including reports from Canada to Jamaica, it made news in several states beyond New York and, though it appeared in North America, was talked about in Europe. The journalism of the event tended to rise above the partisan debates of the time and reviewed facts as they could be sought out. Abraham Lincoln commented on it years later. Near Independence, Missouri, in Clay County, a refugee Mormon community watched the meteor shower on the banks of the Missouri River after having been driven from their homes by local settlers. Joseph Smith, the founder and first leader of Mormonism, afterwards noted in his journal for November 1833 his belief that this event was "a litteral [sic] fulfillment of the word of God" and a harbinger of the imminent second coming of Christ. Though it was noted in the midwest and eastern areas it was also noted in Far West, Missouri.

Denison Olmsted explained the event most accurately. After spending the last weeks of 1833 collecting information, he presented his findings in January 1834 to the American Journal of Science and Arts, published in January–April 1834, and January 1836. He noted the shower was of short duration and was not seen in Europe, and that the meteors radiated from a point in the constellation of Leo and he speculated the meteors had originated from a cloud of particles in space. Accounts of the 1866 repeat of the Leonids counted hundreds per minute/a few thousand per hr in Europe. The Leonids were again seen in 1867, when moonlight reduced the rates to 1,000 meteors per hour. Another strong appearance of the Leonids in 1868 reached an intensity of 1,000 meteors per hour in dark skies. It was in 1866–67 that information on Comet Tempel-Tuttle was gathered, pointing it out as the source of the meteor shower and meteor storms. When the storms failed to return in 1899, it was generally thought that the dust had moved on and the storms were a thing of the past.

1900s
In 1966, a spectacular meteor storm was seen over the Americas. Historical notes were gathered thus noting the Leonids back to 900 AD. Radar studies showed the 1966 storm included a relatively high percentage of smaller particles while 1965's lower activity had a much higher proportion of larger particles. In 1981 Donald K. Yeomans of the Jet Propulsion Laboratory reviewed the history of meteor showers for the Leonids and the history of the dynamic orbit of Comet Tempel-Tuttle. A graph from it was adapted and re-published in Sky and Telescope. It showed relative positions of the Earth and Tempel-Tuttle and marks where Earth encountered dense dust. This showed that the meteoroids are mostly behind and outside the path of the comet, but paths of the Earth through the cloud of particles resulting in powerful storms were very near paths of nearly no activity. But overall the 1998 Leonids were in a favorable position so interest was rising.

Leading up to the 1998 return, an airborne observing campaign was organized to mobilize modern observing techniques by Peter Jenniskens at NASA Ames Research Center. In 1999, there were also efforts to observe impacts of meteoroids on the Moon, as an example of transient lunar phenomenon. A particular reason to observe the Moon is that our vantage from a location on Earth sees only meteors coming into the atmosphere relatively close to us, while impacts on the Moon would be visible from across the Moon in a single view. The sodium tail of the Moon tripled just after the 1998 Leonid shower which was composed of larger meteoroids (which in the case of the Earth was witnessed as fireballs). However, in 1999 the sodium tail of the Moon did not change from the Leonid impacts.

Research by Kondrat'eva, Reznikov and colleagues at Kazan University had shown how meteor storms could be accurately predicted, but for some years the worldwide meteor community remained largely unaware of these results. The work of David J. Asher, Armagh Observatory and Robert H. McNaught, Siding Spring Observatory and independently by Esko Lyytinen in 1999, following on from the Kazan research, is considered by most meteor experts as the breakthrough in modern analysis of meteor storms. Whereas previously it was hazardous to guess if there would be a storm or little activity, the predictions of Asher and McNaught timed bursts in activity down to ten minutes by narrowing down the clouds of particles to individual streams from each passage of the comet, and their trajectories amended by subsequent passage near planets. However, whether a specific meteoroid trail will be primarily composed of small or large particles, and thus the relative brightness of the meteors, was not understood. But McNaught did extend the work to examine the placement of the Moon with trails and saw a large chance of a storm impacting in 1999 from a trail while there were less direct impacts from trails in 2000 and 2001 (successive contact with trails through 2006 showed no hits).

2000s
Viewing campaigns resulted in spectacular footage from the 1999, 2001, and 2002 storms which produced up to 3,000 Leonid meteors per hour. Predictions for the Moon's Leonid impacts also noted that in 2000 the side of the Moon facing the stream was away from the Earth, but that impacts should be in number enough to raise a cloud of particles kicked off the Moon which could cause a detectable increase in the sodium tail of the Moon. Research using the explanation of meteor trails/streams have explained the storms of the past. The 1833 storm was not due to the recent passage of the comet, but from a direct impact with the previous 1800 dust trail. The meteoroids from the 1733 passage of Comet Tempel-Tuttle resulted in the 1866 storm and the 1966 storm was from the 1899 passage of the comet. The double spikes in Leonid activity in 2001 and in 2002 were due to the passage of the comet's dust ejected in 1767 and 1866. This ground breaking work was soon applied to other meteor showers – for example the 2004 June Bootids. Peter Jenniskens has published predictions for the next 50 years. However, a close encounter with Jupiter is expected to perturb the comet's path, and many streams, making storms of historic magnitude unlikely for many decades. Recent work tries to take into account the roles of differences in parent bodies and the specifics of their orbits, ejection velocities off the solid mass of the core of a comet, radiation pressure from the Sun, the Poynting–Robertson effect, and the Yarkovsky effect on the particles of different sizes and rates of rotation to explain differences between meteor showers in terms of being predominantly fireballs or small meteors.

Predictions until the end of the 21st century have been published by Mikhail Maslov.

In media

The 1940 poem "East Coker" by T. S. Eliot refers to the Leonids in section 2.

Two appearances of the Leonids frame the story of the 1985 novel Blood Meridian by Cormac McCarthy.
"Night of your birth. Thirty-three. The Leonids they were called. God how the stars did fall. I looked for blackness, holes in the heavens. The Dipper stove." – p. 3
"The rain had stopped and the air was cold. He stood in the yard. Stars were falling across the sky myriad and random, speeding along brief vectors from their origins in night to their destinies in dust and nothingness." – p. 351

The 1833 shower is referenced in the fourth section of William Faulkner's short story "The Bear," as published in his 1942 novel Go Down, Moses. As Ike reads the entries chronicling the slaves owned by his family, the recording for Tomy lists her death as June 1833, "Yr stars fell"."

The plot of "Halloween Approximately", a 2000 episode of Malcolm in the Middle, revolves around an attempt to view the Leonids.

In season 1, Episode 15 of Thunderbirds Are Go, "Relic", Tracy family members, Alan and Scott, travel to the far side of the Moon to rescue one of their father's old friends from an almost-decommissioned moonbase at risk of being destroyed by the Leonid meteor shower. The series is set in the year 2060.

In season 1, Episode 1 of (The Brokenwood Mysteries) The Leonids meteor shower is watched by a character in the episode as he proposed to his wife on the 17th November and his killer knew where he would be.

See also
 List of meteor showers
 "Stars Fell on Alabama", based on the 1833 Leonid shower
 Perseids, associated with the comet Swift–Tuttle

References

Further reading

External links

 The Discovery of the Perseid Meteors (after the Leonids and) Prior to 1837, nobody realized the Perseids were an annual event, by Mark Littmann
 Lunar Leonids: Encounters of the Moon with Leonid dust trails by Robert H. McNaught
 NASA: Background facts on meteors and meteor showers
 NASA: Estimate the best viewing times for your part of the world
 How to hear the Leonid Meteor Shower
 Observatorio ARVAL – The Leonid Meteors
 Animation of the Leonid Meteor Shower at shadow&substance.com

Leo (constellation)
Meteor showers
November events